A number of hills in Scotland are named An Socach:

An Socach (Glen Ey), 944 m, listed as a Munro and a Marilyn
An Socach (Glen Affric), 921 m, listed as a Munro
An Socach (Glen Cannich), 1069 m, listed as a Munro and a Marilyn
An Socach (Kinlochbervie), 362 m, listed as a Marilyn